Okra leaf may refer to:

 Leaf of okra
 Melokhiya, which thickens like okra